Relevance is the concept of one topic being connected to another topic in a way that makes it useful   to consider the second topic when considering the first. The concept of relevance is studied in many different fields, including cognitive sciences, logic, and library and information science. Most fundamentally, however, it is studied in epistemology (the theory of knowledge). Different theories of knowledge have different implications for what is considered relevant and these fundamental views have implications for all other fields as well.

Definition
"Something (A) is relevant to a task (T) if it increases the likelihood of accomplishing the goal (G), which is implied by T." (Hjørland & Sejer Christensen, 2002).

A thing might be relevant, a document or a piece of information may be relevant. The basic understanding of relevance does not depend on whether we speak of "things" or "information". For example, the Gandhian principles are of great relevance in today's world.

Epistemology 
If you believe that schizophrenia is caused by bad communication between mother and child, then family interaction studies become relevant. If, on the other hand, you subscribe to a genetic theory of relevance then the study of genes becomes relevant. If you subscribe to the epistemology of empiricism, then only intersubjectively controlled observations are relevant. If, on the other hand, you subscribe to feminist epistemology, then the sex of the observer becomes relevant.

Epistemology is not just one domain among others. Epistemological views are always at play in any domain. Those views determine or influence what is regarded relevant.

Logic

In formal reasoning, relevance has proved an important but elusive concept. It is important because the solution of any problem requires the prior identification of the relevant elements from which a solution can be constructed. It is elusive, because the meaning of relevance appears to be difficult or impossible to capture within conventional logical systems. The obvious suggestion that q is relevant to p if q is implied by p breaks down because under standard definitions of material implication, a false proposition implies all other propositions. However though 'iron is a metal' may be implied by 'cats lay eggs' it doesn't seem to be relevant to it the way in which 'cats are mammals' and 'mammals give birth to living young' are relevant to each other. If one states "I love ice cream," and another person responds "I have a friend named Brad Cook," then these statements are not relevant. However, if one states "I love ice cream," and another person responds "I have a friend named Brad Cook who also likes ice cream," this statement now becomes relevant because it relates to the first person's idea.

Another proposal defines relevance or, more accurately, irrelevance information-theoretically. It is easiest to state in terms of variables, which might reflect the values of measurable hypotheses or observation statements. The conditional entropy of an observation variable e conditioned on a variable h characterizing alternative hypotheses provides a measure of the irrelevance of the observation variable e to the set of competing hypotheses characterized by h. It is useful combined with measures of the information content of the variable e in terms of its entropy. One can then subtract the content of e that is irrelevant to h (given by its conditional entropy conditioned on h) from the total information content of e (given by its entropy) to calculate the amount of information the variable e contains about the set of hypotheses characterized by h. Relevance (via the concept of irrelevance) and information content then characterize the observation variable and can be used to measure its sensitivity and specificity (respectively) as a test for alternative hypotheses.

More recently a number of theorists have sought to account for relevance in terms of "possible world logics" in intensional logic. Roughly, the idea is that necessary truths are true in all possible worlds, contradictions (logical falsehoods) are true in no possible worlds, and contingent propositions can be ordered in terms of the number of possible worlds in which they are true. Relevance is argued to depend upon the "remoteness relationship" between an actual world in which relevance is being evaluated and the set of possible worlds within which it is true.

Application

Cognitive science and pragmatics 

In 1986, Dan Sperber and Deirdre Wilson drew attention to the central importance of relevance decisions in reasoning and communication. They proposed an account of the process of inferring relevant information from any given utterance. To do this work, they used what they called the "Principle of Relevance": namely, the position that any utterance addressed to someone automatically conveys the presumption of its own optimal relevance. The central idea of Sperber and Wilson's theory is that all utterances are encountered in some context, and the correct interpretation of a particular utterance is the one that allows most new implications to be made in that context on the basis of the least amount of information necessary to convey it. For Sperber and Wilson, relevance is conceived as relative or subjective, as it depends upon the state of knowledge of a hearer when they encounter an utterance.

Sperber and Wilson stress that this theory is not intended to account for every intuitive application of the English word "relevance". Relevance, as a technical term, is restricted to relationships between utterances and interpretations, and so the theory cannot account for intuitions such as the one that relevance relationships obtain in problems involving physical objects. If a plumber needs to fix a leaky faucet, for example, some objects and tools are relevant (e.g. a wrench) and others are not (e.g. a waffle iron). And, moreover, the latter seems to be irrelevant in a manner which does not depend upon the plumber's knowledge, or the utterances used to describe the problem.

A theory of relevance that seems to be more readily applicable to such instances of physical problem solving has been suggested by Gorayska and Lindsay in a series of articles published during the 1990s. The key feature of their theory is the idea that relevance is goal-dependent. An item (e.g., an utterance or object) is relevant to a goal if and only if it can be an essential element of some plan capable of achieving the desired goal. This theory embraces both propositional reasoning and the problem-solving activities of people such as plumbers, and defines relevance in such a way that what is relevant is determined by the real world (because what plans will work is a matter of empirical fact) rather than the state of knowledge or belief of a particular problem solver.

Economics 

The economist John Maynard Keynes saw the importance of defining relevance to the problem of calculating risk in economic decision-making. He suggested that the relevance of a piece of evidence, such as a true proposition, should be defined in terms of the changes it produces of estimations of the probability of future events. Specifically, Keynes proposed that new evidence  is irrelevant to a proposition , given old evidence , if and only if   , otherwise, the proposition is relevant.

There are technical problems with this definition, for example, the relevance of a piece of evidence can be sensitive to the order in which other pieces of evidence are received.

Law 

The meaning of "relevance" in U.S. law is reflected in Rule 401 of the Federal Rules of Evidence. That rule defines relevance as "having any tendency to make the existence of any fact that is of consequence to the determinations of the action more probable or less probable than it would be without the evidence." In other words, if a fact were to have no bearing on the truth or falsity of a conclusion, it would be legally irrelevant.

Library and information science 

This field has considered when documents (or document representations) retrieved from databases are relevant or non-relevant. Given a conception of relevance, two measures have been applied: Precision and recall:

Recall = a : (a + c) X 100%, where
a = number of retrieved, relevant documents,
c = number of non-retrieved, relevant documents (sometimes termed "silence").
Recall is thus an expression of how exhaustive a search for documents is.

Precision = a : (a + b) X 100%, where 
a = number of retrieved, relevant documents,
b = number of retrieved, non-relevant documents (often termed "noise").

Precision is thus a measure of the amount of noise in document-retrieval.

Relevance itself has in the literature often been based on what is termed "the system's view" and "the user's view". Hjørland (2010) criticize these two views and defends a "subject knowledge view of relevance".

Politics 
During the 1960s, relevance became a fashionable buzzword, meaning roughly 'relevance to social concerns', such as racial equality, poverty, social justice, world hunger, world economic development, and so on. The implication was that some subjects, e.g., the study of medieval poetry and the practice of corporate law, were not worthwhile because they did not address pressing social issues.

See also 
 Source criticism
 Description
 Distraction
 Information-action ratio
 Information overload
 Intention
 Intuitionistic logic
 Kripke semantics
 Relevance theory
 Rubled

References 

 
 Gorayska B. & R. O. Lindsay (1993). The Roots of Relevance. Journal of Pragmatics 19, 301–323. Los Alamitos: IEEE Computer Society Press.
 Hjørland, Birger (2010). The foundation of the concept of relevance. Journal of the American Society for Information Science and Technology, 61(2), 217-237.
 Keynes, J. M. (1921). Treatise on Probability. London: MacMillan
 Lindsay, R. & Gorayska, B. (2002) Relevance, Goals and Cognitive Technology. International Journal of Cognitive Technology, 1, (2), 187–232
 Sperber, D. & D. Wilson (1986/1995) Relevance: Communication and Cognition. 2nd edition. Oxford: Blackwell.
 Sperber, D. & D. Wilson (1987). Précis of Relevance: Communication and Cognition. Behavioral and Brain Science, 10, 697–754.
 Sperber, D. & D. Wilson (2004). Relevance Theory. In Horn, L.R. & Ward, G. (eds.) 2004 The Handbook of Pragmatics. Oxford: Blackwell, 607-632. http://www.dan.sperber.fr/?p=93
 Zhang, X, H. (1993). A Goal-Based Relevance Model and its Application to Intelligent Systems. Ph.D. Thesis, Oxford Brookes University, Department of Mathematics and Computer Science, October, 1993.

External links 

Malcolm Gladwell - Blink - full show: TVOntario interview regarding "snap judgements" and Blink

Information science
Library science terminology
Pragmatics
Logic
Descriptive technique